African Wildlife Safaris Cycling Team was an Australian UCI Continental cycling team established in 2014 and disbanded in 2015.

Team roster

Major wins
2015
Stage 2 Tour of Al Zubarah, Michael Schweizer

References

UCI Continental Teams (Oceania)
Cycling teams established in 2014
Cycling teams based in Australia
2014 establishments in Australia
Cycling teams disestablished in 2015
2014 disestablishments in Australia
Defunct cycling teams based in Australia